Girish Jhunjhnuwala (born 1963) is an Indian hotelier based in Hong Kong. He is the founder of Ovolo Group, an independent hotel group headquartered in Hong Kong, and the Chairman of Hind Group of Companies.

Biography

Girish Jhunjhnuwala was born in Hong Kong in 1963. In 1984 he graduated from the Marshall School of Business at the University of Southern California with a Bachelor of Science in Business Administration.

He began managing his family's OEM watch business under the Hind Group of companies in Hong Kong. He set up watch factories across the Chinese border until 1998. In 2002, he sold the business and ventured into property development when, while searching for a venue for his wife's restaurant, he acquired a building on Arbuthnot Road near Hong Kong's Central district. This building was developed into the first Ovolo serviced apartment. In 2010, he shifted Ovolo Group to hotels. As of now, Ovolo Group operates 13 properties across Hong Kong, Australia, and Bali in Indonesia.

Personal life
Jhunjhnuwala is married to Sarika Jhunjhnuwala, a restaurateur. Together, the couple have three children.

Awards
2016 Ernst & Young Entrepreneur of the Year, China winner
2018 HM Magazine Asia-Pacific Hotelier of The Year (Winner)

Notes

References

External links
Ovolo Group Official website

1963 births
Living people
People educated at Island School
Marshall School of Business alumni
Hong Kong hoteliers
Hong Kong people of Indian descent